The City of Charleston Fire Department provides fire protection and emergency medical services to the city of Charleston, South Carolina.

History

The first fire department in Charleston was a private insurance company which responded to fires of its members only; insured houses were marked by a metal plate on the front of the house. The first fire insurance company in America, the Friendly Society, began in Charleston on February 3, 1736. The earliest records of a volunteer fire department in Charleston appear in the minutes of the Board of Firemasters dated October 18, 1819. References to a Board of Firemasters date back to at least 1792. Until January 1, 1882, the fire department was a voluntary effort; after that date, the city fire department was a paid, professional department of the city. The newly formed fire department of 1882 had 103 firemen. Its first fire pumper was bought in 1910.

Following the 1886 Charleston earthquake that devastated Charleston, the board of the Firemasters suggested selling off some stations, buying new locations, and building stations in a more strategic layout. The result was a series of three firehouses. Each one was designed by Daniel G. Wayne and cost about $28,000. The firehouse at the northeast corner of Wentworth and Meeting Streets became the most prominent and was, until 2013, the central fire house and office for the Chief of the fire department. The other two stations, built in 1887 are at 5 Cannon St. and 116 Meeting St. A new Headquarters opened on Heriot St. in November 2013, and the department has a total of 15 stations. The new Headquarters, Station 9, was designed by Rosenblum Coe Architects is the largest fire station in Charleston and built to withstand severe storms and seismic activity.

Stations and apparatus

Emergency Medical Services
Emergency medical services for the City of Charleston are provided by Charleston County Emergency Medical Services (CCEMS) & Berkeley County Emergency Medical Services (BCEMS). The city is served by both Charleston & Berkeley county EMS and 911 services, since the city is part of both counties. The Charleston Fire Department provides basic life support services and assists the County's ambulatory services.

Fire Marshal Division
The CFD Fire Marshal Division (FMD) consists of a Chief Fire Marshal, three deputy fire marshals, and several assistant fire marshals. The FMD oversees inspections, plan reviews, fire investigations, and community education and risk reduction.

References

Fire Department
Fire departments in South Carolina
1882 establishments in South Carolina
Organizations established in 1882